Cycling at the 2013 Canada Summer Games was in Sherbrooke, Quebec for road cycling and Mont Bellevue for mountain biking.  It was held from the 3 to 18 August.  There were 6 events of cycling.

Medal table
The following is the medal table for cycling at the 2013 Canada Summer Games.

Mountain biking

Men's

Women's

Road cycling

Men's

Women's

References

External links 

2013 Canada Summer Games
2013 in road cycling
2013 in men's road cycling
2013 in women's road cycling
2013 Canada Summer Games
2013 in mountain biking
2013 in cycle racing